The Ware County School District is a public school district in Ware County, Georgia, United States, based in Waycross. It serves the communities of Deenwood, Dixie Union, Manor, Millwood, Ruskin, Sunnyside, Waresboro, and Waycross.

Schools
The Ware County School District has a pre-school, six elementary schools, two middle schools, and one high school.

Pre-schools
Daffodil Preschool

Elementary schools
Waresboro Elementary School
Memorial Drive Elementary School
Williams Heights Elementary School
Center Elementary School
Wacona Elementary
Ruskin Elementary School

Middle school
Waycross Middle School
Ware County Middle School

High school
Ware County High School

References

External links

School districts in Georgia (U.S. state)
Education in Ware County, Georgia